Riina Sikkut (born 12 January 1983) is an Estonian politician. She serves as Minister of Economic Affairs and Infrastructure in the second cabinet of Prime Minister Kaja Kallas. She also served as Minister of Health and Labour in Jüri Ratas' first cabinet. She was sworn in on 2 May 2018, after the former minister Jevgeni Ossinovski had vacated the seat, and left the office on 29 April 2019.

References 

1983 births
Living people
Social Democratic Party (Estonia) politicians
Government ministers of Estonia
21st-century Estonian politicians
21st-century Estonian women politicians
Members of the Riigikogu, 2023–2027
Women members of the Riigikogu